Computer Mediated Environment (CME) is the creation of alternate reality through computer interfaces. It was used by Hoffman and Novak (1998) and refined by Siddiqui and Turley (2004, 2005, 2006, 2007).

Simulation software